= Hireulligeri =

Hire ulligeri
- Village
- Country: India
- State: Karnataka
- District: Belgaum

Languages
  - Official: Kannada
- Time zone: UTC+5:30 (IST)

Hireulligeri is a village in Belgaum district in the southern state of Karnataka, India. It is on the main road between Saundatti and Dharwad. It is 9 km from Saundatti and 25 km from Dharwad. The Sangolli family is very well known in this place. Shree veerabhadreshwara and karemma devi temples are famous here.
